The Gunston District is a high school sports district in Northern Virginia that competes in the Virginia High School League. The schools are mostly from the Alexandria area.

About the district
What used to be the old Alexandria District in 1965 became the Gunston District two years later in 1967 with members Edison, Fort Hunt, Groveton, Mount Vernon, Robert E. Lee and West Springfield. In 1985 Fort Hunt and Groveton High Schools consolidated into West Potomac High School. In 1994, the Gunston District was abandoned as part of a realignment within the Northern Region, until 2017 when the district was revived when the VHSL realigned the districts and regions all together. As part of the VHSL's 4 year realignment, the National and Gunston Districts were consolidated and kept the National District name thus ending the 2nd incarnation of the Gunston District.

Membership History

Final members (2020-21)
Annandale Atoms of Annandale
Hayfield Hawks of Alexandria
Mount Vernon Majors of Alexandria
T.C. Williams Titans of Alexandria
West Potomac Wolverines of Alexandria

Former members
Edison Eagles of Alexandria (1967-1994)
Fort Hunt Federals of Alexandria (1967-1975, 1976-1985) consolidated into West Potomac
Groveton Tigers of Alexandria (1967-1985) consolidated into West Potomac
Lake Braddock Bruins of Burke (1974-1975)
Robert E. Lee Lancers of Springfield (1967-1994) now John R. Lewis
Thomas Jefferson Colonials of Alexandria (1975-1977)
Thomas Jefferson S&T Colonials of Alexandria (1988-1994)
West Springfield Spartans of Springfield (1967-1975)

Virginia High School League